The 1929 SMU Mustangs football team represented Southern Methodist University (SMU) as a member of the Southwest Conference (SWC) during the 1929 college football season. Led by 10th-year head coach Ray Morrison, the Mustangs compiled an overall record of 6–0–4 with a mark of 3–0–2 in conference play, placing second in the SWC.

Schedule

References

SMU
SMU Mustangs football seasons
College football undefeated seasons
SMU Mustangs football